A. Sethumadhavan (born 5 June 1942), popularly known as Sethu, is a Malayalam fiction writer. He has published more than 35 books. He won the Kendra Sahitya Akademi Award in 2007 for the work Adayalangal. He received the Kerala Sahitya Akademi Awards in 1982 and 1978 for his works Pandavapuram and Pediswapnangal; and Vayalar Award for Adyalangal in 2005. He also won Odakkuzhal award for his novel Marupiravi. Sethu's other literary works include Velutha Koodarangal, Thaliyola, Kiratham, Niyogam, Sethuvinte Kathakal and Kaimudrakal. He also served as the chairman and CEO of the South Indian Bank. In 2022, he won the Ezhuthachan Puraskaram, highest literary honour of the Kerala Sahitya Akademi.

Life
Sethu was born in Chendamangalam, a village in Ernakulam district, in the year 1942. He had his school education at Paliam High School, Chendamangalam, and took his bachelor's degree in physics from the Union Christian College, Aluva, at the age of 18.

Sethu began his professional career at a very young age taking him to various parts of the country. This phase of his life was instrumental in shaping his literary sensibilities and came to be reflected in many of his important works.

He worked in certain Central Government departments in North India before joining
the Indian Meteorological Department in Bombay in 1962. In 1964 he took a transfer to Trivandrum and worked in the Meteorological Unit of the Thumba Equatorial Rocket Launching Station. Subsequently, he was promoted and posted to the newly
established Institute of Tropical Meteorology in Pune. Then he worked in Railway Board, New Delhi for a couple of years before switching over to the banking industry in 1968. He joined the banking profession as a Probationary Officer in the State Bank Group. After holding many important positions in the Group, he took over as General Manager in the Corporation Bank and later as the Chairman of the South Indian Bank, a major private sector bank of the country. He served as the chairman and Chief Executive Officer of SIB from 1999 until his retirement in 2005. He was also on the board of the State Bank of Travancore for a period of three years after his retirement.

Widely travelled, he had attended many international conferences both on banking and literature in various countries.

In 2012 September, he replaced eminent historian Bipan Chandra to become the chairman of National Book Trust, New Delhi. In 2015 March, the National Democratic Alliance government removed him from the post in a most ignominious manner, six months before his tenure was due to end. Sethu was replaced by Baldevbhai Sharma, former editor of the Rashtriya Swayamsevak Sangh mouthpiece Panchjanya.

Writing
He had written his first short story in the cramped attic of a Karol Bagh house in Delhi in the year 1967.  He says, "It [the story] was about the severe droughts in Bihar; after a visit to the worst-hit areas and scenes of human suffering I wrote the story without knowing anything about the craft of writing and it was published in the Mathrubhumi magazine by its legendary editor and writer M. T. Vasudevan Nair.". His latest work, The Cuckoo's Nest, is the story of Madam Agatha, a former devout nun who, after renouncing the order, decides to take up the cudgels for the cause of tolerance and pluralism. She decides to set up a unique institution called 'Nest' for empowering the hapless girls from all over the country, discarded by society. The paramount condition set by her is that none of the resident girls are allowed to talk of their religion or caste inside the campus. The novelist attempts to portray the kind of challenges she has to face from vested interests all around while working towards secularism, and how she manages to swim against the tide.

Sethu, is one of the pioneers of modern Malayalam fiction who brought about a radical transformation of sensibility through his writings during the sixties and early seventies. In a literary career spanning over four and half decades, Sethu wrote over 18 novels and 20 collections of short stories. Many of his novels and stories have been translated into English and other Indian languages. His prominent works include Pandavapuram, Niyogam, Kaimudrakal, Vilayattam, Atayalangal, Kilimozhikalkkappuram, Marupiravi and Aliya (Novels), Petiswapnangal, Doothu, Chilakalangalil Chila Gayathrimar, Arundhathiyute Virunnukaran and Sethuvinte Kathakal (Short stories), and Sanidasa, Yathrakidayil (Essays).

Sethu has been honoured with many awards including the Kendra Sahitya Akademi Award, Kerala Sahitya Akademi Award for both novel and short story, Vayalar Award, Odakkuzhal Award and Muttathu Varkey Award. Four of his works have been made into films including the much acclaimed Pandavapuram, which was also made into Bengali titled Nirakar Chhaya. His latest work is Aliya (2013), one of the path-breaking novels in Malayalam.

His book in English, During the Journey and Other Stories published by LiFi Publications Pvt. Ltd., New Delhi  has been released during the New Delhi World Book Fair, 2014.

Works

Novel
 Njangal Adimakal (ഞങ്ങൾ അടിമകൾ)
 Ariyatha Vazhikal (അറിയാത്ത വഴികൾ)
 Kiratham (കിരാതം)
 Thaliyola (താളിയോല)
 Pandavapuram (പാണ്ഡവപുരം)
 Niyogam (നിയോഗം)
 Navagrahangalude Thatavara (നവഗ്രഹങ്ങളുടെ തടവറ) (with Punathil Kunjabdulla)
 Vanavasam (വനവാസം)
 Vilayattom (വിളയാട്ടം)
 Ezham Pakkam (ഏഴാം പക്കം)
 Kaimudrakal (കൈമുദ്രകൾ)
 Kaiyoppum Kaivazhikalum (കൈയൊപ്പും കൈവഴികളും)
 Atayalangal
 Kilimozhikalkkappuram
 Marupiravi (മറുപിറവി)
 Aaliya (ആലിയ)

Short story
 Thinkalazhchakalile Aakasam (തിങ്കളാഴ്ചകളിലെ ആകാശം)
 Velutha Koodarangal (വെളുത്ത കൂടാരങ്ങൾ)
 Aswinathile Pookkal (ആശ്വിനത്തിലെ പൂക്കൾ)
 Prakasathinte Uravidom (പ്രകാശത്തിന്റെ ഉറവിടം)
 Pampum Koniyum (പാമ്പും കോണിയും)
 Pediswapnangal (പേടിസ്വപ്നങ്ങൾ)
 Arundhatiyude Virunnukaran (അരുന്ധതിയുടെ വിരുന്നുകാരൻ)
 Doothu (ദൂത്)
 Guru (ഗുരു)
 Prahelika Kantam (പ്രഹേളികാകാണ്ഡം)

 During the Journey and Other Stories (in English)

Awards
 1978: Kerala Sahitya Akademi Award for Story – Petiswapnangal
 1982: Kerala Sahitya Akademi Award for Novel – Pandavapuram
 1989: Viswadeepam Award – Niyogam
 1994: Padmarajan Award – Uyarangalil
 1999: Malayattoor Award – Kaimudrakal
 1997: Kerala State Film Award for Best Story – Poothiruvathira Ravil (based on novel Njangal Adimakal)
 2006: Vayalar Award – Atayalangal
 2003:  Muttathu Varkey Award – Pandavapuram
 2006: Pravasi Kairali Sahitya Puraskaram
 2007:  Kendra Sahitya Akademi Award – Atayalangal
 2009: Shortlisted for Crossword Book Award – The Wind from the Hills (English translation of the novel Niyogam)
 2011: Bahrain Keraleeya Samajam Award
 2012: Thrissur Souhrudavedi Award
 2013: Odakkuzhal Award – Marupiravi
 2020:Kerala Sahitya Akademi Fellowship
 2020: Abu Dhabi Sakthi Award for Children's Literature – Appuvum Achuvum
 2022:Ezhuthachan Puraskaram

References

External links
 

Malayali people
Living people
1942 births
20th-century Indian short story writers
Indian male novelists
Indian male short story writers
Malayalam-language writers
Malayalam novelists
Malayalam short story writers
Recipients of the Sahitya Akademi Award in Malayalam
Recipients of the Kerala Sahitya Akademi Award
Novelists from Kerala
20th-century Indian novelists
People from Ernakulam district
21st-century Indian novelists
20th-century Indian male writers
21st-century Indian male writers
Recipients of the Ezhuthachan Award
Recipients of the Abu Dhabi Sakthi Award